Caenopangonia hirtipalpis is a species of deer flies in the family Tabanidae.

Distribution
Chile

References

Tabanidae
Diptera of South America
Endemic fauna of Chile
Taxa named by Jacques-Marie-Frangile Bigot
Insects described in 1892